Celje railway station is a railway station in Celje, Slovenia. It was erected in 1846.

External links 
 

Railway station
Railway stations in Slovenia
Railway stations opened in 1846
1846 establishments in the Austrian Empire

Railway stations in Slovenia opened in 1846